The Niue national netball team represent Niue in international netball.

Competitive history

See also
 Netball in Niue

References

 Official webpage

Netball
National netball teams of Oceania
Netball in Niue